Sondre Olden (born August 29, 1992) is a Norwegian professional ice hockey player who is currently playing in the Swiss League. He previously played with Vålerenga of the Norwegian Eliteserien. He was selected by the Toronto Maple Leafs in the 3rd round (79th overall) of the 2010 NHL Entry Draft. He has played for the Norwegian national team in several World Championships, as well as at the 2014 Winter Olympics.

Playing career
In July 2011, Olden signed with the major junior team Erie Otters of the Ontario Hockey League. After the 2011–12 season, Olden was called up to the Toronto Marlies, where he received a try-out with the club. After failing to earn a contract, Olden returned to Norway and signed with Vålerenga of the GET-ligaen. Olden played parts of three seasons with Vålerenga including his last season with the club on loan from Swedish club, Brynäs IF.

Awards and honours

Sondre was selected to the 2011 Team Norway World Junior U20 team roster for the Buffalo, NY IIHF  tournament.
Sondre was named for the best player in the World Junior U20 Championship Division 1A 2012 in Germany.

Career statistics

Regular season and playoffs

International

References

External links

1992 births
Ice hockey players at the 2014 Winter Olympics
Brynäs IF players
Erie Otters players
KHL Medveščak Zagreb players
Leksands IF players
Living people
Manglerud Star Ishockey players
Modo Hockey players
Norwegian ice hockey right wingers
Olympic ice hockey players of Norway
Sheffield Steelers players
Ice hockey people from Oslo
Toronto Maple Leafs draft picks
Vålerenga Ishockey players
Vienna Capitals players